Amagampalli is a small village in Sri Avadhuth Kasinayana mandal, Kadapa district, Andhra Pradesh.

References

Villages in Kadapa district